Lancaster is a city and the county town of Lancashire, England, standing on the River Lune. Its population of 52,234 compares with one of 138,375 in the wider City of Lancaster local government district. The House of Lancaster was a branch of the English royal family. The Duchy of Lancaster still holds large estates on behalf of Charles III, who is also Duke of Lancaster. Its long history is marked by Lancaster Castle, Lancaster Priory Church, Lancaster Cathedral and the Ashton Memorial. It is the seat of Lancaster University and has a campus of the University of Cumbria. The Port of Lancaster played a big role in the city's growth, but for many years the outport of Glasson Dock has become the main shipping facility.

History

The name of the city first appeared in the Domesday Book of 1086, as Loncastre, where "Lon" refers to the River Lune and "castre" (from the Old English cæster and Latin castrum for "fort") to the Roman fort that stood on the site.

Roman and Saxon eras

A Roman fort was built by the end of the 1st century CE on the hill where Lancaster Castle now stands, possibly as early as the 60s, based on Roman coin evidence. Coin evidence also suggests that the fort was not continuously inhabited in its early years. It was rebuilt in stone about 102. The fort name is known only in a shortened form; the only evidence is a Roman milestone found 4 miles outside Lancaster, with an inscription ending L MP IIII, meaning "from L – 4 miles, and that its name began with an L. The fort was perhaps named Lunium.

Roman baths were found in 1812 and can be seen near the junction of Bridge Lane and Church Street. There was presumably a bath-house with the 4th-century fort. The Roman baths incorporated a reused inscription of the Gallic Emperor Postumus, dating from 262 to 266. The 3rd-century fort was garrisoned by the ala Sebosiana and numerus Barcariorum Tigrisiensium.

The ancient Wery Wall was identified in 1950 as the north wall of the 4th-century fort, which was a drastic remodelling of the 3rd-century one, while retaining the same orientation. The later fort is the only example in north-west Britain of a 4th-century type, with massive curtain-wall and projecting bastions typical of the Saxon Shore or Wales. Extension of the technique as far north as Lancaster shows that the coast between Cumberland and North Wales was not left defenceless after the west-coast attacks and the disaster in the Carausian Revolt of 296, which followed from those under Albinus in 197.

The fort at its largest extent covered . Evidence suggests that it stayed in use until the end of Roman occupation of Britain. Church Street and some of St Leonard's Gate probably mark the initial course of the Roman road up the valley to the fort at Over Burrow.

Little is known of Lancaster from the end of Roman rule to the early 5th century and the Norman Conquest of the late 11th century. Despite a lack of documentation for the period, it is thought that Lancaster remained inhabited. It lay on the fringes of the kingdoms of Mercia and Northumbria and over time may have passed from one to the other. Archaeological evidence suggests there was a monastery on or near the site of today's Lancaster Priory by the 700s or 800s. The Anglo-Saxon runic "Cynibald's cross" found at the Priory in 1807 is thought to date from the late 9th century. Lancaster was probably one of several abbeys founded under Wilfrid.

Medieval

After the Norman conquest of England in 1066, Lancaster fell under the control of William I, as stated in the Domesday Book of 1086, which has the earliest known mention of Lancaster as such in any document. The founding Priory charter dated 1094 is the first known document specific to Lancaster. By this time William had passed Lancaster and its surroundings to Roger de Poitou. The document also suggests the monastery was refounded as a parish church some time before 1066.

Lancaster became a borough in 1193 under King Richard I. Its first charter, dated 12 June 1193, was from John, Count of Mortain, who later became King of England.

Lancaster Castle, partly built in the 13th century and enlarged by Elizabeth I, stands on the site of a Roman garrison. During The Great Raid of 1322, damage was done to the castle by Robert the Bruce, though it resisted the attack and was restored and strengthened by John of Gaunt, 1st Duke of Lancaster, who added much of the Gateway Tower and a turret on the keep or Lungess Tower, which has been named "John o' Gaunt's Chair". In 1322 the Scots burnt the town. It was rebuilt but removed from its position on the hill to the slope and foot. Again in 1389, after the Battle of Otterburn, it was destroyed by the Scots. Lancaster Castle is known as the site of the Pendle witch trials in 1612. It was said that the court based in the castle (the Lancaster Assizes) sentenced more people to be hanged than any other in the country outside London, earning Lancaster the nickname, "the Hanging Town". It also figured prominently in the suppression of Catholicism during the Reformation – at least eleven Catholic priests were executed and a memorial to them as the Lancaster Martyrs stands by the city centre.

The traditional emblem of the House of Lancaster is the Red Rose of Lancaster, similar to that of the House of York with a white rose. The names derive from emblems of the Royal Duchies of Lancaster and York in the 15th century. This erupted into a civil war over rival claims to the throne during the Wars of the Roses.

More recently the term "Wars of the Roses" has been applied to rivalry in sports between teams from Lancashire and Yorkshire. It is also applied to the annual Roses Tournament between Lancaster and York universities.

Lancaster gained a first charter in 1193 as a market town and borough, but had to await city status until 1937. Many central buildings and ones along St George's Quay date from the 18th century, as the port became one of the UK's busiest and the fourth most important in the UK slave trade. Among prominent Lancaster slave-traders were Dodshon Foster, Thomas Hinde and his eponymous son. However, Lancaster's role as a major port ceased as the river began to silt up. Morecambe, Glasson Dock and Sunderland Point took over as outports for brief periods. Heysham Port has now eclipsed all those on the Lune.

Recent history
Lancaster is mainly a service-oriented city. Products include animal feed, textiles, chemicals, livestock, paper, synthetic fibre, farm machinery, HGV trailers and mineral fibres. In recent years, a high-tech sector has emerged from Information Technology and Communications firms investing in the city.

A permanent military presence was built up with the completion of Bowerham Barracks in 1880. The Phoenix Street drill hall was completed in 1894.

In March 2004, Lancaster was granted Fairtrade City status.

Lancaster was home to the European headquarters of Reebok. After merging with Adidas, Reebok moved to Bolton and Stockport in 2007.

In May 2015 Queen Elizabeth II visited the castle for commemorations for the 750th anniversary of the creation of the Duchy of Lancaster.

Governance

The former City and Municipal Borough of Lancaster and the Municipal Borough of Morecambe and Heysham along with other authorities merged in 1974 to form the City of Lancaster district within the shire county of Lancashire. This was given city status in the United Kingdom and Lancaster City Council is the local governing body for the district. Lancaster is an unparished area and has no separate council. It is divided into wards such as Bulk, Castle, Ellel, John O'Gaunt (named after John of Gaunt, 1st Duke of Lancaster), Scotforth East, Scotforth West, Skerton East, Skerton West, and University and Scotforth Rural.

Political representation

Most of the city lies in the Lancaster and Fleetwood constituency for elections of Members of Parliament to the House of Commons. The current MP for Lancaster and Fleetwood is Cat Smith of the Labour Party. The Skerton part of the city lies in the Morecambe and Lunesdale constituency represented by David Morris of the Conservative Party.

Before Brexit, it was in the North West England European Parliamentary Constituency.

In the late 1990s and early first decade of the 21st century, the city council was under the control of the Morecambe Bay Independents (MBIs), who campaigned for an independent Morecambe council. In 2003, their influence waned and Labour became the largest party on the council. They formed a coalition with the Liberal Democrats and Greens. At the May 2007 local elections, Labour lost ground to the Greens in Lancaster and the MBIs in Morecambe, resulting in no overall control, with all parties represented in a PR administration. The 2011 elections saw Labour emerge as the largest party. They reached a joint administrative arrangement with the Greens.

The 2019 Lancaster City Council election results put no party in overall control. The council is run by a coalition of Labour, Green, Eco-Socialist Independent and Liberal Democrat councillors, supported by the Independent Group, with Conservatives and MBIs in opposition. The cabinet consists of 4 Labour, 4 Green, 1 Eco-Socialist, 1 Independent Group. At 10 seats, Lancaster has one of the country's largest Green Party representations.

Geography
Lancaster is Lancashire's northernmost city, three miles inland from Morecambe Bay on the River Lune (from which comes its name), and the Lancaster Canal.

Built-up area
Lancaster, Morecambe and Heysham have been identified by the Office for National Statistics as forming the Lancaster/Morecambe Built-up area, with a population of 97,150 in 2011.

Green belt

There is a small portion of green belt on the northern fringe of Lancaster, covering the area into Carnforth and helping to prevent further urban expansion towards nearby Morecambe, Hest Bank, Slyne and Bolton-le-Sands.

Transport

Road

The M6 motorway passes to the east of Lancaster with junctions 33 and 34 to the south and north. The A6 road, one of the main historic north–south roads in England, leads south to Preston, Chorley and Manchester and north to Carnforth, Kendal, Penrith and Carlisle. It currently runs from Luton, Bedfordshire, to Carlisle, Cumbria. In passing through Lancaster it gives access to nearby Carnforth, Kendal and Garstang. The Bay Gateway opened in 2016, linking Heysham and the M6 with a dual carriageway.

Lancaster's main bus operator is Stagecoach Cumbria & North Lancashire, with a network of services from Lancaster bus station throughout the Lancaster District and frequent services to more distant places such as Kendal, Keswick, Kirkby Lonsdale, Preston and Blackpool. There are frequent buses to Lancaster University, with the No. 1 and No. 1A services running every 10–15 minutes using double-deckers, with less frequent services 4, 41 and 42.

Other routes are covered by Kirkby Lonsdale Coach Hire, including the 582 to Kirkby Lonsdale, Settle and Skipton and the 89 to Knott End-on-Sea.

Rail

Lancaster is served by the West Coast Main Line, which runs through Lancaster railway station. The station was formerly named Lancaster Castle, to differentiate it from Lancaster Green Ayre on the Leeds–Morecambe line, which closed in 1966. There are through train services to and from London, Glasgow, Edinburgh, Birmingham, Manchester, Leeds and Barrow-in-Furness, with a local service to Morecambe.

The long-term aim of the city council is to open a railway station serving the university and south Lancaster, although this is not feasible in the short or medium term with current levels of demand. The Caton–Morecambe section of the former North Western railway is now used as a cycle path.

Water and air

Historically, the Port of Lancaster gained importance in the 18th century. In 1750 the Lancaster Port Commission was established to develop the port. However, in more recent years, shipping visits Glasson Dock, where the Port commission is now based.

The Lancaster Canal and River Lune pass through the city.

The nearest airports are Manchester, Liverpool and Blackpool.

Cycling
In 2005, Lancaster was one of six English towns chosen to be cycling demonstration towns to promote cycling as a means of transport.

Education

At Bailrigg south of the city is Lancaster University, a research university founded in 1964 with an annual income of about £319 million, 3,000 staff and 17,415 registered students. Its business school is one of two in the country to gain a six-star research rating. Its physics department rated #1 in the United Kingdom in 2008. InfoLab21 at the university is a Centre of Excellence for Information and Communication Technologies. LEC (Lancaster Environment Centre) has over 200 staff and shares premises with the government-funded CEH. In 2017 it was rated 21st nationally for research in The Times Higher league table. For teaching, it gained the highest Gold ranking for quality in the 2017 government TEF, and in 2018 was ranked 9th for its teaching by The Independent and 9th by The Guardian. The Times Higher placed it 137th worldwide for research and 58th worldwide for arts and humanities. Lancaster University was named International University of the Year by The Times and The Sunday Times Good University Guide in 2020. It has campuses in Malaysia, China and Ghana and plans one in Leipzig, Germany.

Lancaster is also home to a campus of the University of Cumbria – more centrally located on the site of the former St Martin's College – which was inaugurated in 2007. It provides undergraduate and postgraduate courses in the arts, social sciences, business, teacher training, health care and nursing.

Jamea Al Kauthar Islamic College, in the former Royal Albert Hospital building on Ashton Road, is an independent girls' school, providing education in a Muslim tradition.

Further education
Lancaster and Morecambe College

Secondary schools
Lancaster Royal Grammar School and Lancaster Girls' Grammar School are selective-entry grammar schools. In 2016 both were rated by the Sunday Timesin the top 50 UK schools based on student achievement.
Ripley St Thomas Church of England Academy
Our Lady's Catholic College
Central Lancaster High School
Skerton Community High School (now closed)

Primary schools
Lancaster Steiner School 
Scotforth St Pauls CofE Primary School
Moorside Primary School
St Bernadette's Catholic Primary School
Bowerham Primary School 
The Cathedral Catholic Primary School 
Dallas Road Community Primary School 
Willow Lane (formerly Marsh) Community Primary School
Castle View (formerly Ridge) Community Primary School 
Lancaster Christ Church CofE Primary School
St Joseph's Catholic Primary School 
Skerton St Lukes CofE Primary School 
Lancaster Ryelands Primary School

Special Educational Needs (SEN) Schools
The Loyne
Morecambe Road School

Culture

Lancaster has a range of historic buildings and venues, having retained many fine examples of Georgian architecture. Lancaster Castle, the Priory Church of St. Mary and the Edwardian Ashton Memorial are among the sites of historical importance. Its many museums include Lancaster City Museum, Maritime Museum, the Cottage Museum, and Judges' Lodgings Museum.

Lancaster Friends Meeting House dating from 1708, is the longest continual Quaker meeting site in the world, with an original building built in 1677. George Fox, founder of Quakerism, was near the site several times in the 1660s and spent two years imprisoned in Lancaster Castle. The meeting house holds regular Quaker meetings and a wide range of cultural activities including adult learning, meditation, art classes, music and political meetings. The Lancaster Grand Theatre is another historic cultural venue, under its many names. It has played a major part in social and cultural life since it was built in 1782.

Lancaster is known nationally for its Arts scene. There are 600 business and organisations in the region involved directly or indirectly in arts and culture.

In 2009 several major arts bodies based in the district formed a consortium called Lancaster Arts Partners (LAP) to champion strategic development of arts activities in Lancaster District. Notable partners include Ludus Dance, More Music, the Dukes among others. LAP curates and promotes "Lancaster First Fridays", a monthly multi-disciplinary mini-festival under its brand "Lancaster Arts City".

Lancaster University has a public arts organisation, part of LAP, known as Lancaster Arts at Lancaster University. Its programmes include Lancaster's Nuffield Theatre, one of the largest professional studio theatres in Europe, the Peter Scott Gallery, with the most significant collection of Royal Lancastrian ceramics in Britain, and the Lancaster International Concerts Series, drawing nationally and internationally renowned classical and world-music artists.

The gallery in the Storey Creative Industries Centre is now programmed and run by Lancaster City Council. In 2013 the previous incumbent organisation "The Storey Gallery" moved out of the building and reformed as "Storey G2". The Storey Creative Industries Centre is also home to Lancaster's Litfest, which runs an annual literature festival. In the summer months Williamson Park hosts outdoor performances, including a Dukes "Play in the Park", which over the past 26 years has attracted 460,000 people, as the UK's biggest outdoor walkabout theatre event.

Lancaster is known as the Northern City of Ale, with almost 30 pubs serving cask ale. The pubs include the White Cross, Three Mariners, Borough and Water Witch. There are two cask ale breweries: Lancaster Brewery and a microbrewery run by the Borough. There is a local CAMRA (Campaign for Real Ale) branch at Lunesdale.

The Lancaster Grand Theatre and the Dukes are notable venues for live performance, as are the Yorkshire House (currently closed), Jailors Barrel, The John O' Gaunt and The Bobbin. Throughout the year events are held in and around the city, such as the Lancaster Music Festival, Lancaster Jazz Festival, and Chinese New Year celebrations in the city centre.

Every November the city hosts a daylight and art festival entitled "Light Up Lancaster", which includes a prominent fireworks display.

Lancaster still has two city-centre cinemas; Vue and the Dukes playhouse. The 1930s art deco Regal Cinema closed in 2006. The Gregson Centre is also known for small film screenings and cultural events.

Art and literature
John Henderson (c.1770-1853) painted many views of the town. One of these together with a poetical illustration (which relates to the treacherous sands of Morecambe Bay) by Letitia Elizabeth Landon was published in Fisher's Drawing Room Scrap Book, 1833

Sport

Lancaster's main football team, Lancaster City, plays in the Northern Premier League Premier Division having won promotion as champions of Division One North in 2016–2017. It plays its home matches at the Giant Axe, which can take 3,500 (513 seated) and was formed in 1911 originally as Lancaster Town F.C. Lancaster City has been seven-times Lancashire FA Challenge cup winners and in 2010-11 won the Northern Premier League President's cup for a second time. Lancaster John O' Gaunt Rowing Club is the fifth-oldest surviving rowing club in the UK, outside the universities. It competes nationally at regattas and heads races run by British Rowing. The clubhouse stands next to the weir at Skerton.

The city entertains contestants in the Lancaster International Youth Games, a multi-sport 'Olympic' style event featuring competitors from Lancaster's twin towns: Rendsburg (Germany), Perpignan (France), Viana do Castelo (Portugal), Aalborg (Denmark), Almere (Netherlands), Lublin (Poland) and Växjö (Sweden).

Lancaster Cricket Club is sited near the River Lune. It has two senior teams that participate in the Palace Shield. Rugby union is a popular sport in the area, with the local clubs being Vale of Lune RUFC and Lancaster CATS.

Lancaster is home to the Golf Centre, Lansil Golf Club, Forest Hills and Lancaster Golf Club. It also has a Lancaster Amateur Swimming and Waterpolo Club that competes in the north-west. It trains at Salt Ayre and at Lancaster University Sports Centre. Lancaster is home to a senior UK team. Water polo is also popular in the area.

The local athletics track near the Salt Ayre Sports Centre is home to both Lancaster and Morecambe AC. It regularly fields athletes across disciplines including track and field, cross country, road and fell running. It competes in several local and national leagues including the Young Athletics League, the Northern Athletics League and the local Mid Lancs League (Cross-Country in Winter, and Track and Field in Summer).

Music

The city's semi-professional Haffner Orchestra has a reputation for classical music. It performs in the Ashton Hall in the city centre and at Lancaster University.

During parades and festivals it is common to see two other long standing musical groups perform, Lancaster City Brass, which is the oldest remaining brass band in the city celebrating its 75th anniversary in 2021 and Batala who recently completed 15 years of Samba Regge drumming.

Lancaster has been producing successful bands and musicians since the 1990s, notably the drummer Keith Baxter of 3 Colours Red and folk-metal band Skyclad, who also featured Lancaster guitarist Dave Pugh, and the thrash metal band D.A.M., who were all from Lancaster, recording two albums for the Noise International label, with Dave Pugh appearing on the second.

The all-girl punk-rock band Angelica used the Lancaster Musicians' Co-operative, the main rehearsal and recording studio in the area.

The city has also produced many other musicians, including singer and songwriter John Waite, who first became known as lead singer of The Babys and had a solo #1 hit in the US, "Missing You". As part of the band Bad English, John Waite also had a #1 hit in the Billboard top hundred in the 1970s called "When I See You Smile". Additionally, Paul James, better known as The Rev, former guitarist of English punk band Towers of London who is now in the band Day 21 and plays guitar live on tour for The Prodigy; Chris Acland, drummer of the early 1990s shoegaze band Lush; Tom English, drummer of North East indie band Maxïmo Park and Steve Kemp, drummer of the indie band Hard-Fi.

Lancaster continues to produce bands and musicians such as singer-songwriter Jay Diggins, and acts like The Lovely Eggs, receiving considerable national radio play and press coverage in recent years. More recently, Lancaster locals Massive Wagons signed to Nottingham-based independent label Earache Records. The city is also the founding home of the dance-music sound systems Rhythm Method and ACME Bass Company. Pioneers in the field of the free party, these two systems and others forged strong representations of the genre in the North West of England in the 1990s.

Since 2006, Lancaster Library has hosted regular music events under the Get it Loud in Libraries initiative. Musicians such as The Wombats, The Thrills, Kate Nash, Adele and Bat for Lashes have taken part. Get It Loud in Libraries has gained national exposure, featuring on The One Show on BBC1 and having gigs reviewed in Observer Music Monthly, NME and Art Rocker.

Notable popular music venues include The Dukes, The Grand Theatre, The Gregson Centre, The Bobbin, The Pub and The Yorkshire House, which since 2006 has hosted such acts as John Renbourn, Polly Paulusma, Marissa Nadler, Baby Dee, Diane Cluck, Alasdair Roberts, Jesca Hoop, Lach, Jack Lewis, Tiny Ruins and 2008 Mercury Prize nominees Rachel Unthank and the Winterset. Other venues include the Dalton Rooms, the Park Hotel and The Hall, China Street. These host Lancaster's diverse music culture, such as the Lancaster Speakeasy or Stylus.

The Lancaster Jazz and Lancaster Music Festivals are respectively held every September and October, at venues throughout the city. In 2013 the headline jazz act was The Neil Cowley Trio, performing at The Dukes, whilst one of the Lancaster Music Festival headline acts was Jay Diggins at the Dalton Rooms.

Media

Heart North Lancashire & Cumbria (formerly "The Bay") has been a commercial radio station for north Lancashire and south Cumbria. Its studios are based at St George's Quay in the city and it broadcasts on three frequencies: 96.9 FM (Lancaster), 102.3 FM (Windermere) and 103.2 FM (Kendal). It is now part of the Manchester-based Heart North West.

Beyond Radio is a voluntary, non-profit community radio station for Lancaster and Morecambe and broadcasts on 103.5FM and online. Operated by Proper Community Media (Lancaster) Ltd, the station and broadcasts 24 hours a day from The Old Bowling Pavilion in Palatine Avenue Park, Bowerham. It took over from Diversity FM, a community radio station run by Lancaster and District YMCA, which had closed in April 2012.

Lancaster University has its own student radio station, Bailrigg FM, broadcasting on 87.7 FM, and an online student-run television station called LA1:TV (formerly LUTube.tv) and a student-run newspaper named SCAN.

The city is home to the film production company A1 Pictures, which founded the independent film brand Capture.

Commercially available newspapers include the tabloids The Lancaster Guardian and The Visitor (mainly targeted at residents of Morecambe). Both are based on the White Lund Industrial Estate in Morecambe. Virtual Lancaster, founded in 1999, is a non-commercial volunteer-led resource website also featuring local news, events and visitor information.

Places of interest

Ashton Memorial 
Duke's Playhouse
Lancaster Grand Theatre
Greaves Park
The Judges Lodgings
Lancaster Castle
Lancaster Cathedral
Lancaster City Museum
Lancaster Priory
Lancaster Royal Grammar School
Lancaster Town Hall
Lune Millennium Bridge
Quayside Maritime Museum
Queen Victoria Memorial 
Ruskin Library at Lancaster University
The Gregson Centre
Storey Gallery
Westfield War Memorial Village
Williamson Park

Notable people

Arts and entertainment
Joe Abercrombie (born 1974) – fantasy writer and film editor, was born in Lancaster and attended LRGS.
Cherith Baldry (born 1947) – children's and fantasy writer, was born in Lancaster.
Laurence Binyon (1869–1943) – poet and dramatist, was born in Lancaster.
Hubert Henry Norsworthy (1885–1961) – organist and composer, died in Lancaster.
Mabel Pakenham-Walsh (1937–2013) – artist, was born in Lancaster.
Jon Richardson (born 1982) – comedian, grew up in Lancaster and attended LRGS.
Thomas Thompson (1880–1951) – writer and broadcaster.
John Waite (born 1952) – rock musician, was born in Lancaster.
Dustin Demri-Burns (born 1978) – actor, writer and comedian.
Keith Wilkinson – television news reporter, was born in Lancaster

Business
Henry Cort (c. 1741–1800) – English ironmaster and inventor, was probably born in Lancaster.
James Crosby (born 1956) – chief executive of HBOS until 2006, attended Lancaster Royal Grammar School.
Thomas Edmondson (1792–1851) – businessman and inventor of the Edmondson railway ticket, was born in Lancaster.
Robert Gillow (1704–1772) was the founder of Gillows of Lancaster, an English furniture manufacturer.
Sir Ronald Halstead (1927–2021) – chair and Chief Executive of the Beecham Group in 1984–1985 and Deputy Chair of British Steel in 1986–1994 was born in Lancaster and attended Lancaster Royal Grammar School.
James Williamson (1842–1930) – businessman and politician who created Williamson Park and Ashton memorial, was born in Lancaster and attended Lancaster Royal Grammar School.

Crime
Lauren Jeska (born 1974) – a transgender athlete, was convicted of the attempted murder of an official, Ralph Knibbs.
Buck Ruxton (1899–1936) – marital murderer, resided and practised medicine at 2 Dalton Square.

Politics and journalism
Henry D. Gilpin (1801–1860) – Attorney General of the United States, was born in Lancaster.
Erik de Mauny (1920–1997) – foreign correspondent, died in Lancaster.
Sir Lancelot Sanderson (1863–1944) – Conservative MP and judge, died in Lancaster.

Science and humanities
J. L. Austin (1911–1960) – philosopher and developer of the theory of speech acts, was born in Lancaster.
John Ambrose Fleming (1849–1945) – electrical engineer and physicist, was born in Lancaster.
Edward Frankland (1825–1899) – chemist who originated the concept of valence, was born near Lancaster and educated at LRGS.
Jaroslav Krejčí (1916–2014) – Czech-British sociologist, was a professor at the University of Lancaster and died in Lancaster.
Geoffrey Leech (1936–2014) – linguistics researcher, was a professor at the University of Lancaster and died in Lancaster.
Richard Owen (1804–1892) – biologist who coined the term "dinosaur", lived in Brock Street.
William Turner (1832–1916) – anatomist and academic, was born in Lancaster.
Paul Wellings (born 1953) – ecologist, served as a professor and Vice-Chancellor of Lancaster University.
Emily Williamson (1855–1936), English philanthropist and co-founder of the RSPB, was born in Lancaster.
Gavin Wood (born 1980) – co-founded and headed Ethereum.

Sport
Michael Allen (1933–1995) – international cricketer, died in Lancaster.
Arthur Bate (1908–1993) – professional footballer, died in Lancaster.
James Beattie (born 1978) – professional footballer, was born in Lancaster.
Harold Douthwaite (1900–1972) – first-class cricketer, was born and died in Lancaster.
Scott Durant (born 1988) – Olympic gold medal-winning rower, was a pupil at Lancaster Royal Grammar School.
Trevor Glover (born 1951) – first-class cricketer and rugby union player, was born in Lancaster.
William Gregson (1877–1963) – first-class cricketer, died in Lancaster.
Sarah Illingworth (born 1963) – international cricketer (New Zealand), was born in Lancaster.
Edward Jackson (1849–1926) – first-class cricketer, was born in Lancaster.
John Jackson (1841–1906) – first-class cricketer, was born in Lancaster.
Scott McTominay (born 1996) – professional footballer currently with Manchester United, was born in Lancaster.
John Pinch (1870–1946) – international rugby union player, was born and died in Lancaster.
Jason Queally (born 1970) – Olympic gold medal-winning cyclist, was a pupil at Lancaster Royal Grammar School.
Matt Rogerson (born 1993) – professional Rugby Union player currently with London Irish, was born in Lancaster.
Fred Shinton (1883–1923) – professional footballer, died in Lancaster.
Alan Warriner-Little (born 1962) – champion darts player, was born in Lancaster.

Twinned cities

Lancaster is twinned with:

See also

St John the Evangelist's Church, Lancaster
St Thomas' Church, Lancaster
Christ Church, Lancaster
Duke of Lancaster
Duchy of Lancaster
Lancaster power stations
Lancaster Bomber

References

Bibliography

External links

Lancaster City Council – Homepage of Lancaster City Council
Ordnance survey map of Lancaster circa 1890
Regional Europe - Lancaster
Visit Lancaster Website – Tourism Website for Lancaster

 
County towns in England
Towns in Lancashire
Roman fortifications in England
Unparished areas in Lancashire
Geography of the City of Lancaster